is the eighth single by Japanese singer Yōko Oginome. Written by Masao Urino and Nobody, the single was released on March 26, 1986 by Victor Entertainment.

Background and release
"Flamingo in Paradise" was the first single to be co-written by Urino, who went on to pen several of Oginome's other hit singles by the end of the 1980s. The rock duo Nobody (Yukio Aizawa and Toshio Kihara) also co-wrote many other Oginome songs, including the singles "Dance Beat wa Yoake made" and the No. 1 single "Stranger Tonight".

The B-side, "Slope ni Tenki Ame", was used as the theme song of the anime OVA Bari Bari Densetsu.

The music video features Oginome as a cowgirl crossing the desert. She is also seen wearing the same pink wig and outfit used in the "Dancing Hero (Eat You Up)" video.

"Flamingo in Paradise" peaked at No. 5 on Oricon's singles chart and sold over 146,000 copies.

Track listing

Charts

Year-end charts

References

External links

1986 singles
Yōko Oginome songs
Japanese-language songs
Songs with lyrics by Masao Urino
Victor Entertainment singles